Joanna & Wang Ruo-lin is the second studio album by Joanna Wang, released in January 2009. It comprises two discs, given two separate titles: the first, also titled Joanna & Wang Ruo-lin, is described in this article; disc 2 is titled The Adult Storybook, under the name "New Tokyo Terror".

The album's title includes Wang's English and Chinese names, thereby reflecting the duality of the singer and the songwriter. The first disc displays the performer and includes covers of works by other artists. Conversely, the second disc emphasizes the creative Wang, as every song on it was written by her. Although her father, co-producer Ji-ping "Bing" Wang (王治平), was involved in the album's production, Wang was given more freedom, enabling her to fully express herself through her music.

Track listing
All songs written by Roger Joseph Manning Jr. (music) and Joanna Wang (lyrics), except where noted.
"Tikiville (English)" – 3:52
"Maybe Some Other Time (English)" – 3:50
"Vincent" (Don McLean) – 5:28
"一種念頭" – 4:37
"我的愛" – 3:43
"Times of Your Life" (music by Roger Nichols, lyrics by Bill Lane) – 3:15
"Tikiville (Chinese)" – 3:53
"Aubrey" (David Gates) – 4:08
"Maybe Some Other Time (Chinese)" – 3:48
"玫瑰玫瑰我愛你" (music by Chen Gexin, lyrics by Wu Cun) – 2:26

Personnel
Joanna Wang - vocals
Roger Joseph Manning Jr. - piano, electric piano, organ, keyboard, kazoo, marimba
Val McCallum - electric guitar
Paul Bushnell - bass
Brian MacLeod - drums, percussion
Cary Park - acoustic guitar, mandolin
Rasheed - acoustic guitar
Melody Liang - backing vocals

Production
Producers - Bing Wang, Joanna Wang
Engineers - Eric Corne, 
Second engineers - Sadaharu Yagi, John Nuss 
Mixing - Craig Burbidge, Eric Corne, Dave Yang
Mastering - Pete Doell

References

External links
王若琳《Joanna & Wang Ruo-lin》

Joanna Wang albums
2009 albums